The Evangelical Fellowship of Missions Agencies was formed in 1946 as a result of the National Association of Evangelicals (NAE) recognition that there was not a sufficient amount of networking and communication between the missions arms of the NAE members.  

In 2012, the EFMA (renamed as "The Mission Exchange") was merged with Cross Global Link to form Missio Nexus. The current president of Missio Nexus is Ted Esler.

References

Evangelical parachurch organizations
Christian organizations established in 1946
Evangelical organizations established in the 20th century
Christian missions